Sacha Clémence (born 1 June 1988) is a French professional footballer who plays as a forward for US Lège Cap-Ferret in the Championnat National 3.

Club career
After making his debut in the French lower divisions, Clémence joined Ligue 2 side Angers SCO in 2014. He made his full professional debut a few weeks later, coming on the pitch in the second half of a 3–2 defeat against Nîmes Olympique in August 2014.

References

External links

Sacha Clémence foot-national.com Profile

1988 births
Living people
Sportspeople from Dijon
Association football forwards
French footballers
Ligue 2 players
Championnat National players
Championnat National 2 players
Championnat National 3 players
USJA Carquefou players
Vannes OC players
Saint-Colomban Sportive Locminé players
Angers SCO players
US Créteil-Lusitanos players
Tours FC players
Liga I players
FC Dunărea Călărași players
French expatriate footballers
French expatriate sportspeople in Romania
Expatriate footballers in Romania
Footballers from Bourgogne-Franche-Comté